Olimpia Grudziądz is a Polish football club from Grudziądz. The club was formed on 30 June 1923. Currently, Olimpia plays in the III liga, following their relegation from the II liga in the 2020–21 season.

On 1 March 2022, thanks to defeating Wisła Kraków in a penalty shoot-out, Olimpia Grudziądz advanced to the Polish Cup semi-finals, making it the best achievement in the club's history.

Current squad

Notable football players 
Had international caps for Poland (all prior to playing for Olimpia).
  Mariusz Pawlak (2009–2011)
  Sławomir Wojciechowski (2008–2009)
  Marcin Kaczmarek (2014–2019)

References

External links 
 Official website 
 Olimpia Grudziądz on 90minut.pl 

 
Association football clubs established in 1923
Sport in Grudziądz
1923 establishments in Poland